Matthew Ebden and Andrew Whittington were the defending champions but chose not to defend their title.

Sriram Balaji and Jonathan Erlich won the title after defeating Sander Arends and Tristan-Samuel Weissborn 6–3, 6–2 in the final.

Seeds

Draw

References

External links
 Main draw

Santaizi ATP Challenger - Doubles
2019 Doubles